The 1982 CECAFA Cup was the 10th edition of the tournament. It was held in Uganda, and was won by Kenya. The matches were played between November 13–27.

Group A

Group B

Semi-finals

Third place match

Final

References
Rsssf archives

CECAFA Cup
CECAFA
1982 in Ugandan football
International association football competitions hosted by Uganda